The 1943 Alahan Panjang earthquakes occurred on June 8 and June 9 UTC (June 9, 1943, local time) in Sumatra, then under Japanese occupation. This was an earthquake doublet (the shocks occurred at the same location on consecutive days).

The first mainshock occurred on June 8 at 20:42 UTC. It ruptured the Suliti segment of the Sumatran Fault Zone. The magnitude was given as  7.2, or  7.1.

The second mainshock occurred on June 9 at 03:06 UTC. It ruptured the Sumani segment of the Sumatran Fault Zone and perhaps the northwestern part of the Suliti segment. The magnitude was given as  7.5, or  7.4.

Alahan Panjang was damaged in the earthquakes. Right lateral offsets were reported near the town of Solok.

Near the Sumani segment, earthquake doublets occurred repeatedly. Similar earthquake doublet nearby include the earthquakes in 1926 and 2007.

See also 
List of earthquakes in 1943
List of earthquakes in Indonesia

References

External links 

Alahan Panjang earthquakes, 1943
1943 in Indonesia
Earthquakes in Indonesia
June 1943 events
1943 disasters in Indonesia